Cedillo is a town and municipality in Spain, located in the province of Cáceres, community of Extremadura. According to the 2008 census (INE), the municipality has a population of 518 inhabitants.

Languages 
The town is close to the border with Portugal. Although the official language is Spanish, the traditional local dialect is a variety of Portuguese. The Portuguese spoken here is not Standard Portuguese but instead consists of an archaic Portuguese dialect arrived in the 18th century known as Cedilhero. It is similar to the Alentejan dialect of Portuguese spoken in the neighbouring area of Portugal.

Portuguese is spoken here because most of the first inhabitants of this region were Portuguese colonists who arrived in the 18th century. In addition, in Cedillo, speaking Spanish was considered an act of pedantry and a symbol of social and economic relief. The children who could attend school spoke Spanish because they learned it in school, but they still spoke Portuguese in their homes.

Currently older people mostly speak Portuguese, while young people speak Spanish but understand both languages. Cedilhero is on the verge of dying out here under pressure from Spanish.

References

Municipalities in the Province of Cáceres